Pristimantis paisa is a species of frog in the family Strabomantidae. It is endemic to Colombia and is only known from the Cordillera Central in the Antioquia Department. The specific name refers to the inhabitants of the area where this frog occurs, called paisas.

Description
Male Pristimantis paisa measure  in snout–vent length and females . Tympanum is not prominent. The fingers and the toes have discs and lateral keels but no webbing. Skin is smooth. Coloration is drab brown without well developed patterns.

Habitat
It is a nocturnal species that requires high moisture.

Pristimantis paisa is a quite common frog that is able to persist in secondary forest and wet pastureland. It can locally suffer from ranching and agriculture. It is not present in protected areas.

References

paisa
Amphibians of the Andes
Amphibians of Colombia
Endemic fauna of Colombia
Amphibians described in 1999
Taxa named by John Douglas Lynch
Taxonomy articles created by Polbot